The Imperial Theatre is an 853-seat theater located in downtown Augusta, Georgia, United States. The theater opened on February 18, 1918. It is named after the Imperial Theatre in New York City.

History

Augusta's Imperial Theatre began in 1917 as a vaudeville showcase named The Wells Theatre. It was founded by impresario Jake Wells and was designed by architect G. Lloyd Preacher in the Victorian Renaissance style for a total cost of $47,792.00.

Below are price listings for opening night.

Prices for opening night, February 18, 1918:

 Matinee: $0.10 and $0.20
 Evening: $0.15
 Orchestra $0.35
 Balcony: First Section: $.35, Remainder: $0.25, Gallery (Colored Section) $0.15

The Wells Becomes The Imperial

On Sunday, October 6, 1918, over 3,000 cases of Spanish Flu were reported. With the death of 52 servicemen from a local military camp (now known as Fort Gordon),  the city announced the closure of all public venues, including the theatre. The quarantine began October 7, and during this time Jake Wells encountered great financial difficulties. He sold The Wells to Lynch Enterprises. On November 27, 1918, shortly after the sell, the quarantine is lifted. Two weeks later the theatre opened under the name of Jake Wells with The B. F. Keith Supreme Vaudeville Co. After the acquisition of several other local theatres by Lynch Enterprises, The Wells Theatre's was changed to The Imperial Theatre. Throughout the early 1900s the theatre continued to provide the city of Augusta and the surrounding area with great entertainment. In 1929, as vaudevillian acts decreased in popularity and motion pictures enjoyed meteoric success, Miller decided to renovate the Imperial into a full-time movie house in the popular art deco style.  In March 1936 "The Trail of the Lonesome Pine," starring Henry Fonda and Fred McMurray, became the first color film to be shown at the Imperial.  It is in the Broad Street Historical District and is listed on the National Register as important to the character of the entire district.

Due to the decline of the downtown area, the Imperial continued as a film theatre until it closed in 1981. In 1985 it was recognized for its architectural significance and reopened as a performing arts venue with the help of local performing arts groups like the Augusta Ballet and the Augusta Players.

Today the Imperial Theatre is a vibrant arena for entertainment, with a full season of musicals, dance, concerts, comedy and more. It is noted in the National Register as critical to the character of the Broad Street Historic District. Currently, the Imperial is the only operating historic theatre in Augusta, connecting artists and patrons by providing superb entertainment in a gracious and historic setting.  Today, the Imperial is still the home for the Augusta Ballet, the Augusta Players, as well as the Morris Museum of Art's Southern Soul + Song Series, Storyland Theatre, Dance Augusta, Columbia County Ballet, Ed Turner and the Number 9 Band, Westobou Festival events and the Poison Peach Film Festival.

Celebrity at the theatre

Although it is a certainty that a large number of celebrities of the day must have graced the stage of the theatre, only a few are documented in the Imperial Theatre's archives. Among the earliest recorded appearances was the visit of Charlie Chaplin, who appeared at the theatre on April 18, 1918, selling Liberty war bonds.
Included in this bill of fare was Leo Carrillo, who later became the Cisco Kid's partner, Pancho; and the famous ballet dancer Anna Pavlova.

See also

Broad Street Historic District (Augusta, Georgia)
Arts and culture in Augusta, Georgia

References

External links
Imperial Theatre — official website
Theatre and Democracy - Segment from C-SPAN's Alexis de Tocqueville Tour

Theatres in Georgia (U.S. state)
Buildings and structures in Augusta, Georgia
Culture of Augusta, Georgia
Tourist attractions in Augusta, Georgia
Theatres on the National Register of Historic Places in Georgia (U.S. state)
National Register of Historic Places in Augusta, Georgia